Rolf Bernt Thorsen (born 22 February 1961) is a Norwegian former competition rower, world champion and Olympic medalist.

Thorsen was born in Zürich, Switzerland, in 1961. He received a silver medal in quadruple sculls at the 1988 Summer Olympics in Seoul, together with Alf Hansen, Vetle Vinje, and Lars Bjønness. He also received a silver medal in quadruple sculls at the 1992 Summer Olympics in Barcelona, together with Kjetil Undset, Per Sætersdal, and Lars Bjønness. Thorsen is three times world champion in double sculls. In 1982 together with Alf Hansen, in 1989 with Lars Bjønness, and again in 1994 with Lars Bjønness.

Thorsen has been president for the Norwegian Rowing Federation in the period from 2000 to 2010, and also a board member of Særforbundenes Fellesorganisasjon. Professionally he was managing director of NCC Property Development, a major commercial property developer across the Nordics from 2007 to 2014. 2014 - 2019 he was managing director for Oslo S Utvikling AS, a major developer of commercial and residential property in Norway. 2019 - 2021 he served as CEO for the listed (Oslo Børs) residential developer Selvaag Bolig ASA.
Thorsen currently heads the Norwegian real estate company Polaris Eiendom AS, as CEO.

Thorsen was one of the founding fathers of The Norwegian Green Building Council, that created and owns a nationised version of the environmental certification scheme BREEAM (BREEAM-NOR), and he headed the organisation as chair of the Board of Directors for 5 years (2014 - 2019).
Currently Thorsen is member of the Board of Directors at NP Bygg AS, Agaia AS and The Norwegian Opera and Ballet.

References

External links

1961 births
Living people
Norwegian male rowers
Olympic rowers of Norway
Olympic silver medalists for Norway
Rowers at the 1984 Summer Olympics
Rowers at the 1988 Summer Olympics
Rowers at the 1992 Summer Olympics
Olympic medalists in rowing
Norwegian sports executives and administrators
Medalists at the 1992 Summer Olympics
Medalists at the 1988 Summer Olympics
World Rowing Championships medalists for Norway
Thomas Keller Medal recipients